The Duchy of Vilafermosa is a line of dukes in Aragón, originated in 1476 by King John II of Aragón whose members bear the family name of Aragó. The first duke was a bastard of John II called Alfons d'Aragó (Alphonse of Aragó).

Dukes: 
Alphonse I   until 1485
Alphonse II  1485-1513
John I       1513-1528
Alphons III  1528-1550
Martí        1550-1581
Aldonça, sister of Martí; she originated the family of Azlor, titled Dukes of Vilafermosa
Ferran I     1581-1592
María Luisa (duchess), daughter of Ferran I; she originated the families named Borja and Aragó-Gurrea, titled Dukes of Vilafermosa, by union to the descents of the last duchess
Francesc I   1592-1622
Joana-Lluisa 1622–1652, daughter of Francesc I, she originated the families Borja and Aragó-Gurrea.

References

Vilafermosa